(1594 – July 25, 1637) was a Japanese daimyō of the early Edo period, who ruled the Nanokaichi Domain. He was the fifth son of Maeda Toshiie.

His court title was Yamato no kami.

Family
Father: Maeda Toshiie (1539–1599)
Mother: Jufuku-in
Siblings:
 Maeda Toshinaga (1562–1614)
 Maeda Toshimasa
 Maeda Toshitsune (1594–1658)
 Maeda Toshitoyo
 Maeda Kō
 Maeda Ma'a
 Maeda Gō
 Maeda Chise

References
 Maeda Toshitaka on "World Nobility" (August 9, 2008)

Tozama daimyo
Maeda clan
1594 births
1637 deaths